Colin Delport (born 4 August 1978) is a Zimbabwean cricketer. He played fifteen first-class matches between 1999 and 2004.

See also
 CFX Academy cricket team

References

External links
 

1978 births
Living people
Zimbabwean cricketers
CFX Academy cricketers
Midlands cricketers
Sportspeople from Kadoma, Zimbabwe